Tubelining is a technique of ceramic decoration.  It involves squeezing a thin line of clay body through a nozzle onto the ware being decorated.  An alternative term is "slip trailing".

The skill takes time to acquire and it is associated with art pottery rather than mass production.

UK production 
Tubelining has been used by a number of firms in the Staffordshire Potteries.
In particular, the Moorcroft pottery continues to be well known for using tubelining as an integral feature of its designs.

USA production 

Designers using tubelining included Frederick Hurten Rhead, who taught the technique at the Arequipa Pottery in California.

References

See also 
Charlotte Rhead

Types of pottery decoration